Jannik Sommer (born 13 September 1991) is a German footballer who plays for Wormatia Worms.

Career

Sommer began his career with Kickers Offenbach and made his 3. Liga debut for the club in April 2011, as a substitute for Alexander Huber in a 2–0 home win over Wacker Burghausen. He joined Eintracht Frankfurt II in July 2013. In the following season, Sommer transferred to SVN Zweibrücken and then FK Pirmasens after half a season. 1 July 2015, Sommer joined SV Waldhof Mannheim from Primasens.

In his first season with Regionalliga side, SV Waldhof Mannheim, Sommer scored a total of 16 goals, being the fourth highest scorer of the league.

References

External links

1991 births
Living people
German footballers
Kickers Offenbach players
Eintracht Frankfurt II players
FK Pirmasens players
SV Waldhof Mannheim players
FC 08 Homburg players
FSV Frankfurt players
Wormatia Worms players
3. Liga players
Regionalliga players
Association football midfielders
Sportspeople from Darmstadt
21st-century German people